Godfrey T. McHugh (September 30, 1911 – July 5, 1997) was a United States Air Force general, and served as military aide to President John F. Kennedy.

Biography

Early years
McHugh was born in Brussels, Belgium, to American parents. He received a baccalaureate in science and languages from the University of Paris in 1929.

He was oil production supervisor for the West Texas Production Company in Fort Worth, Texas from 1938 to 1942.

He dated Jacqueline Bouvier (who later married John F. Kennedy and became First Lady of the United States).

Military career
After the U.S. entered World War II, McHugh joined the U.S. Army Air Forces as a captain on January 31, 1942, and received pilot training. From February 1942 to 1943 he was a planning officer with the Air War Plans Division of the War Department General Staff. From 1943 to 1946 was executive of the U.S. Air Force Scientific Advisory Board assigned to General H.H. Arnold, commanding general U.S. Army Air Forces. He also served in both the European and Pacific Theaters with the Scientific Advisory Board. He was with the Army General Staff Intelligence Foreign Liaison Office for a year, graduated from the Army General Staff Strategic Military School in 1947. Then he became assistant executive and senior aide to General Hoyt S. Vandenberg, chief of staff, U.S. Air Force, from 1948 to 1953. McHugh attended the National War College from 1953 to 1954. During the World War II, he rose to the rank of lieutenant colonel and was stationed in the European and Pacific Theater. He was awarded the Legion of Merit for his wartime service.

Kennedy Administration

He became Air Force Aide to President Kennedy, and was promoted to Brigadier General in 1961.
As military aide to the President, his duties included supervising Air Force One. He very often rode in the middle of the front seat of the Presidential State Car while transporting the President. While he was in Dallas, Texas during the John F. Kennedy assassination, McHugh was moved farther back in the motorcade that day rather than riding in the President's car. He was also present during the president's autopsy.

After Kennedy's death, McHugh guarded Kennedy's body on Air Force One and until the President's body was returned to Washington, D.C.

In a 1978 oral history interview that McHugh gave to the John F. Kennedy Presidential Library (that was withheld from the public until 2009), McHugh provided detailed statements that once Kennedy's body was back on board Air Force One he did not know that Lyndon Johnson was also on board. Due to safety concerns that there was a conspiracy, Jacqueline Kennedy's repeated requests, and the fact that the plane's interior cabin was quite warm, McHugh had requested that the plane take off. When the plane still had not taken off, McHugh went forward to again ask pilot James Swindal why the plane had not taken off and he was told that Johnson did not want the plane to take off yet. McHugh went to find Johnson and he soon found Johnson in a bathroom with Johnson saying repeatedly, "They're going to get us all. It's a plot. It's a plot. It's going to get us all." According to the General, Johnson "was hysterical, sitting down on the john there alone in this thing." In a documented interview the previous week in 1978 McHugh had also stated to the House Select Committee on Assassinations investigator Mark Flanagan the same basic account of what he witnessed.

Jordan Marsh incident
In the summer of 1963, Jacqueline Kennedy was at the Kennedy family compound in Massachusetts while she was pregnant.  Air Force personnel became concerned that if Mrs. Kennedy were to deliver the child at the Otis Air Force Base hospital, that the maternity ward furniture would be unsatisfactory for the newborn child of the President and First Lady.  The Air Force then spent $5,000.00 ($44,000 in 2021) of taxpayer money at Jordan Marsh & Company to purchase new furniture, and allowed media photographs of a U.S. Navy aide standing next to the purchase.  After the photos made their way into the Washington Post, an irate President Kennedy telephoned McHugh and ordered him to have the furniture returned.  Kennedy's profanity-laden phone call with McHugh is now public.

Later years
McHugh married Lillian Triplett Fall in 1967. The couple retired to Palm Beach, Florida in 1986.

General McHugh died in Palm Beach in 1997 and is buried in Arlington National Cemetery.

Awards
Legion of Merit
Air Force Commendation Medal
Army Commendation Medal
American Campaign Medal
European-African-Middle Eastern Campaign Medal
World War II Victory Medal
Army of Occupation Medal
National Defense Service Medal with star
Air Force Longevity Service Ribbon with four bronze oak leaf clusters

Dates of Rank

References

Further reading
The Death of a President, November 20-November 25, 1963 by William Manchester, Harper & Row, 1967

External links

 JFK Library contributions
 JFK Library overview
 AF.Mil biography
 McHugh House
 Air Force One Graphic History

1911 births
1997 deaths
Military personnel from Brussels
University of Paris alumni
National War College alumni
United States Air Force generals
Recipients of the Legion of Merit
Kennedy administration personnel
People associated with the assassination of John F. Kennedy
Military aides to the President of the United States
Burials at Arlington National Cemetery